Lateef Kayode Jakande  (23 July 1929 – 11 February 2021) was a Nigerian journalist and politician who served as governor of Lagos State from 1979 to 1983, and later Minister of Works under the Sani Abacha military regime.

Background
Lateef Kayode Jakande was born in the Epetedo area of Lagos Island, Lagos State on July 29, 1929. Both parents are from Omu-Aran, Kwara State.
He studied at the Lagos public school at Enu-Owa, Lagos Island, then at Bunham Memorial Methodist School, Port Harcourt (1934–43). He studied at King's College, Lagos in 1943, and then enrolled at Ilesha Grammar School in 1945, where he edited a literary paper called The Quarterly Mirror.

In 1949, Jakande began a career in journalism first with the Daily Service and then in 1953 joining the Nigerian Tribune. In 1956 he was appointed editor-in-chief of the Tribune by the owner Chief Obafemi Awolowo.

After leaving the Tribune in 1975, Jakande established John West Publications and began to publish The Lagos News. He served as the first President of the Newspaper Proprietors Association of Nigeria (NPAN).

Governor of Lagos State
Encouraged by Awolowo, he ran for election as executive governor of Lagos State in 1979, on the Unity Party of Nigeria platform. He defeated his opponents, Adeniran Ogunsanya of Nigerian People's Party (NPP) and Sultan Ladega Adeniji Adele of National Party of Nigeria with a total of 559,070 votes and was subsequently sworn in as governor. His administration was effective and open and implemented the cardinal policies of his party. He introduced housing and educational programs targeting the poor, building new neighbourhood primary and secondary schools and providing free primary and secondary education. He gave poor people's children education and many of them are now very prominent in the society today. He established the Lagos State University and the Nigerian Institute of Journalism, Lagos' house is named after the former governor. Jakande's government constructed over 30,000 housing units. The schools and housing units were built. Some of the housing units include low cost estates at Amuwo-Odofin, Ijaiye, Dolphin, Oke-Afa, Ije, Abesan, Iponri, Ipaja, Abule Nla, Epe, Anikantamo, Surulere, Iba, Ikorodu, Badagry. To fund some of the projects, Jakande increased the tenement rates and price of plots of land in affluent areas of Victoria Island and Lekki Peninsula and the processing fees for lottery, pools and gaming licenses. He also completed the construction of the General Hospital in Gbagada and Ikorodu and built about 20 health centres within the state. As a governor, he established 23 local government councils which were later disbanded by the military.
He also started a metroline project to facilitate mass transit. The project was halted and his tenure as Governor ended when the military seized power on 31 December 1983.

Later career
After the military take-over in 1983, Jakande was charged, prosecuted and convicted of treason, although later he was pardoned.
After being freed, he accepted the position of Minister of Works under the Sani Abacha military regime, which earned him some criticism. He claimed that he had accepted the post under pressure from M. K. O. Abiola and other progressive leaders.
In a later interview, he said he had no regrets about the decision to serve. However, his association with Abacha handicapped his career in politics after the restoration of democracy in 1999.

Alhaji Lateef Kayode Jakande became a senior member of All Nigeria Peoples Party (ANPP) when the UNPP and All People's Party (APP) merged. In June 2002, he was "suspended" by a faction of the ANPP loyal to Chief Lanre Razaq.
Jakande was the first chairman of the Action Party of Nigeria (APN) when it was formed in November 2006. In May 2009, he was reported to be engaged in a struggle for control of the party with his former ally, Dr. Adegbola Dominic.

Many prominent people attended his 75th birthday celebration. At this event, former Governor of Lagos State Bola Ahmed Tinubu said Jakande was worth celebrating for his life of consistent commitment to public service. Former Imo State Governor Achike Udenwa said Jakande's life and times epitomised "resilience, positive audacity, bravery and bravado, and a knack for excellence."

Later life and death 
Jakande died in Lagos on the February 11, 2021. His body was interred at Vaults and Gardens Cemetery, Ikoyi, Lagos state on Friday February 12, 2021 under strict observance of COVID-19 protocols.

See also
 Timeline of Lagos, 1980s
 Lateef Raji

References

External links 

1929 births
2021 deaths
Yoruba politicians
Governors of Lagos State
Unity Party of Nigeria politicians
All Nigeria Peoples Party politicians
Federal ministers of Nigeria
Nigerian newspaper founders
Politicians from Lagos
People convicted of treason against Nigeria
Recipients of Nigerian presidential pardons
Library of Congress Africa Collection related
Lagos State politicians
Nigerian editors
King's College, Lagos alumni
Yoruba journalists
Nigerian journalists
20th-century Nigerian writers
Founders of Nigerian schools and colleges